The first terrestrial television broadcast signals in Africa occurred on Saturday October 31, 1959 and belonged to the Western Nigeria Television Service (WNTS). Nigeria was one of the first countries to introduce television broadcasting in Africa. Nigeria also has the largest terrestrial television network in Africa which is the Nigerian Television Authority (with over 96 stations scattered around the country). As of 2010, 40% of Nigerian population had television in their homes.

This is a list of television stations based in Nigeria.

List of TV stations

A–E
 Africa Independent Television
 Africa Magic
 AKBC
 Arewa 24
 Arise News
 Channels TV
 DBN TV
 Emmanuel TV
 1TV Network
 heriatge global academy tv

F–J
 Galaxy TV

K–O
 KAFTAN TV
 Koga TV
 Lagos Television
 Minaj Systems Tv Obosi
 Minaj Broadcast Network Obosi
 Minaj Broadcasting International (MBI) 
 Murhi International Television (MITV)
 News Central Media
 Nigerian Television Authority
 Odenigbo FM Obosi Anambra state
 Ogun State Television
 Ondo State Radiovision Corporation

P–T
 Plus TV Africa
 Silverbird Television
 Trust TV
 TVC Entertainment
 TVC News

U–Z

 WAP TV
 Wazobia TV

See also 
 Media of Nigeria
 List of newspapers in Nigeria
 Nigerian newspapers
 List of radio stations in Nigeria
 Cinema of Nigeria
 Telecommunications in Nigeria
 List of television stations in Africa

References

Bibliography

External links
 Nigeria Broadcasting Commission Website

Television stations in Nigeria